Papists Act may refer to any of the following Acts of Parliament:

 Papists Act 1688
 Papists Act 1715
 Papists Act 1716
 Papists Act 1722
 Papists Act 1732
 Papists Act 1734
 Papists Act 1737
 Papists Act 1738
 Papists Act 1740
 Papists Act 1742
 Papists Act 1778